S0 may refer to:
 S0 Truss, an element of the International Space Station
 S0, elemental sulfur
 IATA airline designator for Aerolíneas Sosa
 Previously, IATA airline designator for Slok Air Gambia (disestablished)
 the representation of the number 1 in Peano arithmetic
 ACPI S0 power state in computing
 S0 galaxy, an astronomical code for barless lenticular galaxy
 S0, part of the name of certain stars within one arc-second of Sagittarius A*
 S0 (DIN 43864), an output from electricity meters that give pulses proportional to the amount of consumed energy
 the S0 interface bus used in ISDN BRI in telephony

See also
SO (disambiguation)